Giuseppe Pintarelli (21 January 1931 – 26 May 2002) was an Italian racing cyclist. He rode in the 1957 Tour de France.

References

External links
 

1931 births
2002 deaths
Italian male cyclists
Place of birth missing
Sportspeople from Trentino
Cyclists from Trentino-Alto Adige/Südtirol